David Sebastián Solórzano Sánchez (born 8 November 1980) is a Nicaraguan footballer who currently plays for Diriangén and plays for the Nicaragua national football team.

He is Nicaragua's all-time record cap holder.

Club career
He has played for and skippered several leading Nicaraguan clubs including hometown club Diriangén, Parmalat, Real Estelí and Masatepe. He started the 2007 season with second division Managua.

Controversies
When with Parmalat in 2001, he was controversially banned for six months for allegedly attacking referee Fidel Bonilla in a game against Diriangén, despite Bonilla claiming it was only an accident. In 2004, Solórzano signed a contract with Diriangén while still tied to Estelí but then made a U-turn and declared himself committed to Estelí.

International career
Solórzano made his debut for Nicaragua in a March 1999 UNCAF Nations Cup match against Guatemala and has, as of September 2014, earned a total of 49 caps, scoring no goals. He has represented his country in 9 FIFA World Cup qualification matches and played at the 1999, 2001, 2003, 2007, 2009, 2011 and 2013 UNCAF Nations Cups as well as at the 2009 CONCACAF Gold Cup.

International goals
Scores and results list Nicaragua's goal tally first.

References

External links

1980 births
Living people
People from Carazo Department
Association football defenders
Nicaraguan men's footballers
Nicaragua international footballers
2001 UNCAF Nations Cup players
2003 UNCAF Nations Cup players
2007 UNCAF Nations Cup players
2009 UNCAF Nations Cup players
2009 CONCACAF Gold Cup players
2011 Copa Centroamericana players
2013 Copa Centroamericana players
2014 Copa Centroamericana players
Diriangén FC players
Real Estelí F.C. players
Managua F.C. players